VOMO: Vote or Miss Out was a comedy television special organized by ATTN: and When We All Vote, an organization created by former First Lady of the United States Michelle Obama, aimed to encourage electoral participation in the 2020 United States presidential election. Hosted by Kevin Hart, the special aired on ABC on September 14, 2020 and featured comedy and musical performances, as well as appearances by celebrities and political figureheads.

Appearances

 Michelle Obama 
 Arnold Schwarzenegger 
 Will Ferrell
 Jon Hamm
 Larry David
 Susie Essman
 Dave Chappelle
 Chris Rock
 Wanda Sykes
 Amy Schumer
 Tiffany Haddish
 Tim Allen
 Liza Koshy
 2 Chainz
 Lil Baby
 Charlamagne tha God
 Cristela Alonzo
 Whitney Cummings
 Scarlett Johansson
 Jay Leno
 Jaden Smith
 Willow Smith
 Kaia Gerber
 Larry Hogan 
 Ann Romney 
 Cindy McCain

Performers
 Migos - "Bad and Boujee" and "Need It"

References

External links

2020 in American television
2020 television specials
American Broadcasting Company television specials